The 2003–04 FAW Premier Cup was the seventh season of the tournament since its founding in 1997.

Group A

Group B

Quarter finals

Semi finals

Final

References

FAW Premier Cup 2003/4

2003-04
2003–04 in Welsh football cups